Wadlin Lake 173C is an Indian reserve of the Tallcree First Nation in Alberta, located within Mackenzie County. It is 91 kilometres east of Carcajou.

References

Indian reserves in Alberta